Jejuia marina is a Gram-negative, aerobic, rod-shaped and non-motile bacterium from the genus of Jejuia which has been isolated from the beach Udo Island.

References 

Flavobacteria
Bacteria described in 2021